Airdrie North is one of the twenty-one wards used to elect members of North Lanarkshire Council. It elects four councillors and covers northern and eastern parts of Airdrie (Clarkston, Drumgelloch, Holehills and Thrashbush neighbourhoods) plus the outlying villages of Caldercruix, Wattston, Plains and Glenmavis. Established in 2007, a boundary review in 2017 resulted in a very minor change (the loss of a few streets in Burnfoot). In 2019, the ward's population was 20,137.

Councillors

Election results

2022 election

2017 election

2012 election

 

SNP councillor Alan Beveridge resigned from the party and became Independent on 10 February 2015 in opposition to the party's 2015 Westminster Election selection procedures.

2007 election

References

Wards of North Lanarkshire
Airdrie, North Lanarkshire